Arsen Aydinian (born Istanbul, Ottoman Empire, January 19, 1825 – died Vienna, Austria, July 21, 1902) was an Armenian priest, linguist, grammarian, and master of ten languages.

Work 
Arsen Aydinian contributed immensely to the work of Armenian linguistics and grammar. He was from the Viennese Mekhitarist Order, and spoke both Classic or Modern languages. He held several offices, including that of Abbot General of the Viennese Mekhitarist Order. In 1887, he was the leading figure in the establishment of the official journal, Հանդէս ամսօրեայ (Handes Amsoreay), where he published many articles on linguistics. However, Aydinian’s biggest achievement was Քննական քերականութիւն աշխարհաբար կամ արդի հայերէն լեզուի (Critical Grammar of the Vernacular or Modern Armenian Language) published in 1866, which remains a highly important achievement in Armenian linguistics till this day. This book was especially significant due to the fact that the Armenian people at large were demanding the use of a more vernacular language in the literature and arts. This was a breakthrough since Grabar (classic Armenian) was the language mainly associated with priesthood and high-ranked members of society.

References

External links 
Critical Grammar of Vernacular or Modern Armenian - Part I
Critical Grammar of Vernacular or Modern Armenian - Part II
Critical Grammar of Vernacular or Modern Armenian - Part III (Orthography, Pronunciation, and Metrics)

1825 births
1902 deaths
Writers from Istanbul
Mekhitarists
Armenian abbots
Superiors general
Armenian scholars
Armenians from the Ottoman Empire
Emigrants from the Ottoman Empire to Austria-Hungary
Armenian expatriates in Austria
Clergy from Istanbul